Laura Freudenthaler (born 1984, Salzburg) is an Austrian writer. She studied German language and literature at the University of Vienna. Freudenthaler published a book of short stories titled Der Schädel der Madeleine in 2014. She has also published two novels: Die Königin schweigt (winner of the Förderpreis Bremen Literature Prize in 2018), and Geistergeschichte (winner of the EU Literature Prize in 2019). In 2020, she was awarded the 3sat Prize (given at the Festival of German-Language Literature in Klagenfurt) for Der heißeste Sommer.

After staying in France, Freudenthaler lives since 2009 in Vienna.

Works

References

External links

 

Austrian women writers
1984 births
Living people
Writers from Salzburg